The vice president of Uruguay is the person with the second highest position in the executive branch of the Uruguayan government, after the President of Uruguay. The Vice President replaces the elected President in case of his death or absence. The vice president is also an officer in the legislative branch, as president of the Chamber of Senators and of the General Assembly.

The president and vice president run on a single ticket submitted by their party. In case no candidate obtains an absolute majority of votes (50%+1), a runoff is held between the top two candidates. In this case, the candidate who obtains a plurality in the runoff wins the election. The current Vice President is Beatriz Argimón, who took office on March 1, 2020.

History 
The position of Vice-President of the Republic was established in the Constitution of 1934. Previously the President of the Senate assumed the Presidency in case of absence of the President. The Constitution of 1952 established a 9-member executive council, the National Council of Government, abolishing the figure of the Vice President. The Constitution of 1967 eliminated the National Council of Government and resumed the presidential system, maintaining the figure of the Vice President.

List of vice presidents of Uruguay

See also
List of current vice presidents
History of Uruguay
Politics of Uruguay

References

External links
 www.presidencia.gub.uy

Vice Presidents

Vice President of Uruguay, List of
Uruguay, Vice President
Uruguay
1934 establishments in Uruguay